Caldas may refer to:

Places
Çaldaş, Azerbaijan
 Caldas Department, in Colombia
 Caldas, Antioquia, a town in Antioquia, Colombia
 Caldas, Boyacá, a town in Boyacá, Colombia
 Caldas, Minas Gerais, a town in the state of Minas Gerais in Brazil
 Poços de Caldas - a city in the state of Minas Gerais in Brazil
 Caldas de Reis, a municipality in Galicia, Spain
 Caldas (comarca), a comarca in the Province of Pontevedra, Galicia, Spain
 Caldas da Rainha, Portugal
 Caldas de São Jorge, a parish in the municipality of Santa Maria da Feira
 São João de Caldas de Vizela, a parish in the municipality of Vizela
 São Miguel de Caldas de Vizela, a parish in the municipality of Vizela

People
 Francisco José de Caldas, Colombian lawyer and scientist, after whom the department and the town are named.
 António Pereira de Sousa Caldas, Brazilian poet

Others
 Caldas Sport Clube, a football club in Portugal